Hull Arena (originally Humberside Ice Arena and known locally as the Hull Ice Arena) is an ice rink, in the city of Kingston upon Hull, England. It is also used for other sports, trade fairs and as a concert venue, for which it has a maximum capacity of 3,750.

History
The building had a protracted development. Three sites were considered during planning phase: Ferensway, the Marina and the Kingston Clinic site on Beverley Road. Budgeted at £2.5 million, it was originally set to be a joint venture between Humberside County and the city of Hull, and the city received a £1 million grant to that effect. In June 1986 however, Humberside asked the city to return to grant in order to finalize the project on its own, with a tentative completion date of November 1987.

The building's ceremonial cornerstone was laid by Queen Elizabeth II. It was inaugurated on 14 September 1988 by former Olympic figure skating champion John Curry.

The venue closed in March 2020 for renovations worth £1.5 million, which ended up lasting one year and a half. The ice sheet was redone, while the locker rooms and lavatories were renovated. A new lighting rig consisting of eighty spotlights and a clearer sound system were also installed.

The building is nonetheless viewed as outdated, and a new ice rink is being considered as part of a future real estate development on Albion Street.

A 2021 publication pegged the Arena's yearly attendance, which has varied depending on the caliber of resident ice hockey teams, at 147,000.

Ice sports
Hull Arena has been the home of all ice hockey teams within the city, including the Humberside Seahawks, Hull Thunder, and Hull Stingrays of the BNL, and the Hull Stingrays of the Elite League. The current tenants are the Hull Pirates of the NIHL, and their affiliate the Hull Jets.

Other Events
The Arena hosts boxing events for the Matchroom Boxing promotions stable with Hull boxers Luke Campbell and Tommy Coyle amongst those to compete. It was previously used to hold such events in April 1997, March 1998 and June 1998 with boxers including Paul Ingle, Clinton Woods, Howard Eastman and Scott Harrison competing.

The Arena has also hosted WWF/WWE pro wrestling on multiple occasions, such as the Hart Attack '94 and Full Metal '95 tours.

The 2011 edition of the World Masters darts tournament was played at the arena.

Among music acts who have appeared at the Arena are Arctic Monkeys, Faithless, Kings of Leon, Oasis, Robbie Williams, Ed Sheeran and The Libertines.

References

External links

Hull Arena Website

Indoor ice hockey venues in England
Sports venues in Kingston upon Hull
Netball venues in England